Interleukin 10 receptor, beta subunit is a subunit for the interleukin-10 receptor. IL10RB is its human gene.

IL10RB has also recently been designated CDW210B (cluster of differentiation W210B).

The protein encoded by this gene belongs to the cytokine receptor family. It is an accessory chain essential for the active interleukin 10 receptor complex. Coexpression of this and IL10RA proteins has been shown to be required for IL10-induced signal transduction. This gene and three other interferon receptor genes, IFNAR2, IFNAR1, and IFNGR2, form a class II cytokine receptor gene cluster located in a small region on chromosome 21.

References

Further reading

Clusters of differentiation
Type II cytokine receptors